Albert Henderickx (24 September 1900 – 27 June 1965) was a Belgian footballer. He played in one match for the Belgium national football team in 1924.

References

External links
 

1900 births
1965 deaths
Belgian footballers
Belgium international footballers
Place of birth missing
Association football midfielders
Beerschot A.C. players